Sainthia (formerly Nandipur) is a city and a municipality in Suri Sadar subdivision of Birbhum district in the Indian state of West Bengal. The city is known as business city of Birbhum district. The city is under the jurisdiction of Sainthia police station. Sainthia is the fourth most populous city in Birbhum district and 95th most populous city in West Bengal. The city covers an area of 10 km2 and had a population of 44,601 in 2011. Located on the banks of Mayurakshi River, Sainthia has been a major human settlement. The city is famous for Nandikeshwari Temple, one of the Shakti Peethas in Indian subcontinent.

Etymology
It is believed that the name Sainthia is derived from 'Saaita', a term used in 'Khero Khata' (Business Book) by the merchants of Sainthia after worshiping Goddess Nandikeshwari in Poila Boishakh and Vijaya Dashami.

Nandipur was the ancient name of Sainthia. The name Nandipur was originated from the famous temple of Nandikeshwari. The word Nandi comes from Nandikeshwari Temple and the word Pur is a Sanskrit term used for city. Together these words created Nandipur.

History
Sainthia was a small village. Urbanization of this area gained momentum in the recent past, when construction work of the Sahibganj loop line and a bridge over the Mayurakshi River started. Construction of the Khana-Rajmahal section of Sahibganj Loop was completed in October 1859. Construction of the Sainthia railway station was done as part of building the entire line. This large project brought people from different corners of the country to assemble and settle here. Sainthia, an old village trade center, a place of pilgrimage has been emerged into a municipal city in the year 1987.

Geography

Location
The city is situated in the south bank of Mayurakshi River. The soil is generally alluvial and fertile. There was a rich reservoir of groundwater but this stands somewhat depleted due to overuse.

Climate
Sainthia's climate is classified as tropical. In winter, there is much less rainfall in Sainthia than in summer. The average annual temperature is 26.3 °C in Sainthia. The temperature goes very high and it is very humid in summer and quite cold in winter. In a year, the average rainfall is 1328 mm.

Urban Structure

The north–south dimension of the city is comparatively narrow, stretching from the Mayurakshi River in the north to roughly Pariharpur Village in the south—a span of 2–3 km. The east–west dimension of the city is widest with the span of 5–6 km.

Demographics

Historical Population
In 1901, according to L. S. S. O'Molley's Bengal District Gazetters, Sainthia had a population of 2622 and in 1911 Sainthia had a population of 3551.

Latest Population
As of 2011 Census of India, the Sainthia Municipality has a population of 44,601, of which 22,856 are males while 21,745 are females. The population of children under age 6 is 4511, which is 10.11% of the total population of Sainthia. In Sainthia, the female sex ratio is 951, against the state average of 950. The child sex ratio is around 880, compared to the West Bengal state average of 956. The literacy rate of Sainthia is 79.50%, higher than state average of 76.26%. Male literacy is around 84.70% while female literacy is 74.08%. Out of the total population, 16,485 were engaged in work or business activity. Of this, 13,481 were males while 3,004 were females. In the census survey, a worker is defined as a person who does business, job, service, cultivator, or labour activity. Of the total 16,485 working population, 92.97% were engaged in main work while 7.03% were engaged in marginal work. Sainthia has over 10,229 houses.

Ward number 16 is the most populous ward with population of 3814 and ward number 4 is the least populous ward with population of 1638.

Economy

Sainthia is an economically important city and one of the busiest business hubs in the middle part of West Bengal. Sainthia city is the main trading centre in the district. The economy is based on agricultural products and their allied businesses. Rice mills, mustard oil mills, bran oil mills, puffed rice mills, jaggery/gur and galvanized wire product units and other businesses run here. Sainthia is the leader in edible oil industry in Birbhum and one of the leading edible oil producers in West Bengal. There are 10 edible oil mills in Sainthia out of which 9 are Mustard oil mills and 1 is Rice Bran oil mill. The economy of Sainthia stands tall due to the sales of agricultural products. The city is known as an export and import centre for cottage industry and agricultural based different goods. The hinterland of business of Sainthia spreads up to the districts of Jharkhand in the west and Assam in the north east. The city is well connected to different parts of the country. From the city, the agricultural products are exported to different parts of the State and also to different parts of the Eastern India through high roads and railroads. That makes the city the business centre of all sorts of goods distribution and transportation. Its socio-economical status is quite strong and education ratio is steadily increasing.

Sainthia is an important centre for banking and finance. There are 13 bank branches in the city. 9 of them are public sector banks and remaining 4 are private sector banks.

Shopping center developments in Sainthia city increases economic activity and local employment. There are 5 shopping centers that made contribution to the economy of the city. These shopping centers are Cosmo Bazaar, Hyper Mart, Baazar Kolkata, Reliance Trends and M Baazar. Brands like Senco Gold & Diamonds, Zedd Studio, Apollo Pharmacy and Khadim have stores in the city.

Transport

Road 
The National Highway 114 and State Highway 11 runs across the city. These highways links important cities and towns in West Bengal.

Public transport systems in Sainthia include the Government and private buses, electric rickshaws, taxis and auto rickshaws.

Air

The nearest domestic airport is Kazi Nazrul Islam International Airport. The airport is roughly 74 kilometers from central Sainthia.

Railway

The Sainthia railway station serves the entire city and is the most important and key railway station of Birbum district. It also serves as the originating station of 4 important trains. The Sainthia railway station connects to both of Kolkata's two busy rail terminals, Howrah railway station and Sealdah railway station.

Accidents
On 19 July 2010, at 02:13, the Sainthia train collision occurred, when Bananchal express was crashed by Uttarbanga express at platform no. 4.

Healthcare

The city has 1 government funded State General Hospital, 8 private hospitals and 1 veterinary hospital.

Tourism

Sainthia is known for its temples, including the famous Nandikeshwari Temple.

Education

Colleges

There are two colleges in Sainthia:
 Abhedananda Mahavidyalaya -a general stream college under the University of Burdwan. Established in 1964.
 Birbhum Vivekananda Homoeopathic Medical College & Hospital -Established in 1972.

High schools
Sainthia High School
Sainthia Town High School is a boys' only high school.
Shashibhushan Dutta Girls' High School 
Jogeshwari Dutta Girls' High School 
Sainthia Paharhi Baba Vidyapth 
Gitanjali Public School 
Rastravhasa High School

Library

There is one government-sponsored public library in Sainthia.

Sports

Stadiums
The Kamodakinkar Stadium (Jalibagan) is a football and a cricket stadium at Vivekananda Pally, Sainthia, operated by Sainthia Sports Association.

Notable people
Ananda Mohan Chakrabarty (born 1938), microbiologist and scientist

Culture and festivals

Sainthia is influenced much by the culture of West Bengal. Festivals in Sainthia are inherited by the entire state of West Bengal. The language that is generally spoken here are Bengali and Hindi. However, people from other parts of India who have settled in Sainthia, obviously speak other languages. The festivals that are most commonly celebrated are the Durga Puja, Saraswati Puja, Holi, Christmas. Also, Ganesh Puja is done during Sankashti Chaturthi.

The festivals like Durga Puja is sincerely celebrated throughout the city of Sainthia by the local people. Though this festival is celebrated throughout India, the people of Sainthia give more importance to this festival.

References

External links

Cities and towns in Birbhum district
Company towns in India
Hindu holy cities
Hindu pilgrimage sites in India
Populated places established in 1987
Cities in West Bengal